Digrammia burneyata is a species of geometrid moth in the family Geometridae.

The MONA or Hodges number for Digrammia burneyata is 6376.

References

Further reading

 

Macariini
Articles created by Qbugbot
Moths described in 1939